Diana Xu Jidan (born July 7, 1990) is a Chinese model and beauty pageant titleholder who was crowned Miss China 2012 and was represented her country in the 2012 Miss Universe pageants.

Miss China 2012
Diana Xu was crowned Miss Universe China 2012 by Luo Zilin (Miss Universe China 2011) at the Shanghai Grand Theatre, Shanghai, China on 1 September 2012.

Miss Universe 2012
She represented China in Miss Universe 2012 held in December where she won the best national costume award, the first time the award had been won by China.

Miss Universe China Organization
After modeling for various fashion and cosmetics lines in Asia, including LOVA and Shanghai Tang, Diana was appointed by Yue-Sai Kan to be the Executive Manager (赛事执行经理) of the Miss Universe China Organization in 2013, where she is responsible for the recruitment and management of the contestants and winners.  She was featured in the 2014 documentary, "Finding Miss China."

References

External links
Official Miss China website

1990 births
Living people
Chinese beauty pageant winners
Miss Universe 2012 contestants
People from Shanghai